Kerry Madden is an author of teen novels and a professor of creative writing at Antioch University. She is also a professor of Creative Writing at the University of Alabama at Birmingham. Her Husband Kiffen Madden-Lunsford teaches at Carson Gore Elementary in Los Angeles.

Life
Madden received her BA from the University of Tennessee and spent her junior year at Manchester University in England.
She has an MFA in Playwriting from the University of Tennessee.

Kerry Madden-Lunsford is the author of a new picture book, Ernestine's Milky Way, published by Schwartz & Wade of Random House. She also wrote Maggie Valley Trilogy for children, which includes Gentle's Holler, Louisiana's Song and Jessie's Mountain, published by Viking. Her first novel, Offsides, (Morrow) was a New York Public Library Pick for the Teen Age. Her book, Up Close Harper Lee, made Booklist's Ten Top Biographies of 2009 for Youth. Her first picture book, Nothing Fancy About Kathryn and Charlie, was illustrated by her daughter, Lucy, and published by Mockingbird Publishers. Kerry is a regular contributor to the LA Times OpEd Page. She directs the Creative Writing Program at UAB and teaches in the Antioch MFA Program in Los Angeles. The mother of three adult children, she divides her time between Birmingham and Los Angeles.
www.kerrymadden.com

Works
 Offsides William Morrow, 1996, 
 Writing Smarts: A Girl's Guide to Writing Great Poetry, Stories, School Reports, and More! Illustrated by Tracy McGuinness, Pleasant Company, 2002, 
 Gentle's Holler, Viking, 2005,

References

External links
Author's website
Author's blog
"Conversation with Kerry Madden", April 22, 2009

Living people
Year of birth missing (living people)
University of Alabama at Birmingham faculty
American children's writers
American women novelists
21st-century American women writers
20th-century American women writers
20th-century American novelists
21st-century American novelists
University of Tennessee alumni
Novelists from Alabama
American women academics